Ron Nicholls (born 1 September 1951) is an Australian former cricketer. He played two first-class cricket matches for Victoria between 1974 and 1975.

See also
 List of Victoria first-class cricketers

References

External links
 

1951 births
Living people
Australian cricketers
Victoria cricketers
Cricketers from Melbourne